West India Steamship Company was a passenger and cargo steamship company founded in New York City in 1910. West India Steamship Company was founded by Edward R. Bacon, Robert Bacon and Daniel Bacon. Edward R. Bacon was an attorney and Daniel Bacon was a ship broker. Before founding West India Steamship Company all three had worked for the Barnes Steamship Company. They operated the West India Steamship Line. By 1913, West India Steamship Company had cargo routes from New York City and Norfolk, Virginia to Cuba, Mexico, Colón, Panama, and the Windward Islands. By 1921 West India Steamship Company added routes from Mobile, Alabama, to a number of West Indies ports. West India Steamship Company was active in supporting the World War II efforts.

World War II
West India Steamship Company fleet of ships that were used to help the World War II effort. During World War II West India Steamship Company operated Merchant navy ships for the United States Shipping Board. During World War II West India Steamship Company was active with charter shipping with the Maritime Commission and War Shipping Administration. West India Steamship Company operated Liberty ships and Victory ships for the merchant navy. The ship was run by its West India Steamship Company crew and the US Navy supplied United States Navy Armed Guards to man the deck guns and radio.

Ships
Ships owned:
Tymouth Castle 
Duart Castle 
USS Resolute (SP-3218) 1920 to 1926
SS Polar Land built in 1918, sank in 1919 off Sable Island 
SS Lake Frampton

World War II operated:
Liberty Ships:
George A. Lawson 
Martin Van Buren on Jan. 14, 1945 was torpedoed and damaged by German submarine U-1232 off Halifax, Nova Scotia was beached and later scrapped in situ.
Edward R. Squibb
Willard R. Johnsonhttp://www.mariners-l.co.uk/LibShipsW.html
Willard R. Johnson 
SS Frederick Bartholdi on Dec. 25, 1943 ran ashore on Isle of Skye, later was refloated and towed to the Clyde and scrapped.
Other ships:
New Rochelle Victory 	
USS Lebanon (AK-191) in 1945, a C1-M-AV1 cargo ship.

See also

World War II United States Merchant Navy

References 

Defunct shipping companies of the United States
American companies established in 1910